Springdale is an unincorporated community and census-designated place (CDP) in Gaston County, North Carolina, United States. It was first listed as a CDP in the 2020 census with a population of 1,203.  It is bordered on the west and south by the City of Gastonia, on the east by the town of Ranlo, and on the north by the unincorporated community of Monterey Park.

Demographics

2020 census

Note: the US Census treats Hispanic/Latino as an ethnic category. This table excludes Latinos from the racial categories and assigns them to a separate category. Hispanics/Latinos can be of any race.

References

Unincorporated communities in North Carolina
Unincorporated communities in Gaston County, North Carolina
Census-designated places in North Carolina
Census-designated places in Gaston County, North Carolina